Muhammad Ibrahim Kamel (6 January 1927 – 22 November 2001) was an Egyptian diplomat and politician.

Biography
Kamel was born on 6 January 1927. He studied law at Cairo University and graduated in 1947. He and Anwar Sadat, later President of Egypt, were both jailed due to their alleged role in the assassination of Amin Osman, former finance minister, in January 1946. Kamel entered the Egyptian diplomatic service in 1956 and served as ambassador to Zaire, Sweden and West Germany. 

Kamel succeeded Ismail Fahmi as the minister of foreign affairs in December 1977 when Fahmi resigned from the office. He was appointed to the post on 24 December 1977 and served as foreign minister until 16 September 1978 when he also resigned from the office. As foreign minister, he took part in the Camp David Accords, but resigned without signing the treaty. 

Kamel was married to and had two sons. He died on 22 November 2001 at the age of 74.

Works
Kamel published a book entitled The Lost Peace of The Camp David Accords in 1984.

References

External links
 Camp David Accords: A Testimony by Sadat's Foreign Minister
 Obituary at the New York Times

20th-century Egyptian politicians
1927 births
2001 deaths
Ambassadors of Egypt to Sweden
Ambassadors of Egypt to the Democratic Republic of the Congo
Ambassadors of Egypt to West Germany
Foreign ministers of Egypt
Iron Guard of Egypt
Egyptian prisoners and detainees
Egyptian politicians convicted of crimes